Richard John Goatley (born 10 June 1974) is an English cricket administrator and chartered accountant.

Background 
Goatley was educated at St Columba's College, St Albans (1985–1992) and King's College London (1992–1995) where he gained a Bachelor of Laws degree (LLB).

Business career 
He worked for KPMG UK in London (1995–1999) and JHP Ltd in Tring (1999–2001) where he rose to Finance Director. He joined G7 Business Solutions Ltd at St Albans as Finance Director (2001–2005).

Middlesex Cricket 
Goatley became Assistant Secretary and Head of Finance of Middlesex County Cricket Club in March 2005 before subsequent promotions to Finance Director in March 2008, Chief Operating Officer in July 2015 and Chief Executive on 12 October 2015. 

His tenure as chief executive saw Middlesex win the County Championship in 2016. 

He announced his resignation as Middlesex Chief Executive on 2nd July 2021. In a statement the club said: "During his time with us, Richard brought drive and focus."  

Middlesex CCC members described him as, "a man of integrity, foresight and genuine concern for others. He was always very accessible, very candid and without doubt a man of compassion.”

Personal life
He is married to Lucy and has three children.

External links
 Middlesex Executive Board website
 Middlesex CCC announce new Chief Executive
 Company Check profile
 LinkedIn profile

1974 births
Living people
Alumni of King's College London
English cricket administrators
Chief executives of Middlesex County Cricket Club
Secretaries of Middlesex County Cricket Club